The 2012–13 Czech Cup was the twentieth season of the annual football knock-out tournament of the Czech Republic. It began on 22 July 2012 with the preliminary round and ended with the final on 18 May 2013. FK Baumit Jablonec, the winners of the competition qualified for the third qualifying round of the 2013–14 UEFA Europa League.

Teams

Preliminary round
The Preliminary round was played on 22 July 2012.

|}

First round
The First round was played on 29 July 2012.

|}

Second round
12 teams from the Czech First League enter at this stage. The second round was played on 29 August 2012.

|}

Third round
The top four teams from last season's Czech First League enter at this stage. The third round was scheduled to be played on 26 September 2012.

|}

Fourth round
The fourth round was scheduled to be played on 31 October and 28 November 2012.

|}

Quarter-finals
The quarter-finals are scheduled for 2 and 9 April 2013.

|}

First Leg

Second Leg

Semi-finals
The first legs of the semi-finals were played on 24 April and 1 May 2013, and the second legs were played on 8 May 2013.

|}

First Leg

Second Leg

Final
The final was played on 17 May 2013 in Chomutov.

See also
 2012–13 Czech First League
 2012–13 Czech 2. Liga

References

External links
 Official site 
 soccerway.com

2012-13
2012–13 domestic association football cups
Cup